Cluster of differentiation antigen 135 (CD135) also known as fms like tyrosine kinase 3 (FLT-3 with fms standing for "feline McDonough sarcoma"), receptor-type tyrosine-protein kinase FLT3, or fetal liver kinase-2 (Flk2) is a protein that in humans is encoded by the FLT3 gene. FLT3 is a cytokine receptor which belongs to the receptor tyrosine kinase class III. CD135 is the receptor for the cytokine Flt3 ligand (FLT3L).

It is expressed on the surface of many hematopoietic progenitor cells. Signalling of FLT3 is important for the normal development of haematopoietic stem cells and progenitor cells.

The FLT3 gene is one of the most frequently mutated genes in acute myeloid leukemia (AML). High levels of wild-type FLT3 have been reported for blast cells of some AML patients without FLT3 mutations. These high levels may be associated with worse prognosis.

Structure 

FLT3 is composed of five extracellular immunoglobulin-like domains, an extracellular domain, a transmembrane domain, a juxtamembrane domain and a tyrosine-kinase domain consisting of 2 lobes that are connected by a tyrosine-kinase insert. Cytoplasmic FLT3 undergoes glycosylation, which promotes localization of the receptor to the membrane.

Function 

CD135 is a class III receptor tyrosine kinase.  When this receptor binds to FLT3L a ternary complex is formed in which two FLT3 molecules are bridged by one (homodimeric) FLT3L. The formation of such complex brings the two intracellular domains in close proximity to each other, eliciting initial trans-phosphorylation of each kinase domain. This initial phosphorylation event further activates the intrinsic tyrosine kinase activity, which in turn phosphorylates and activates signal transduction molecules that propagate the signal in the cell. Signaling through CD135 plays a role in cell survival, proliferation, and differentiation. CD135 is important for lymphocyte (B cell and T cell) development.

Two cytokines that down modulate FLT3 activity (& block FLT3-induced hematopoietic activity) are:
 TNF-alpha (Tumor necrosis factor-alpha) 
 TGF-beta (Transforming growth factor-beta)
TGF-beta especially, decreases FLT3 protein levels and reverses the FLT3L-induced decrease in the time that hematopoietic progenitors spend in the G1-phase of the cell cycle.

Clinical significance

Cell surface marker 

Cluster of differentiation (CD) molecules are markers on the cell surface, as recognized by specific sets of antibodies, used to identify the cell type, stage of differentiation and activity of a cell. In mice, CD135 is expressed on several hematopoietic (blood) cells, including long- and short-term reconstituting hematopoietic stem cells (HSC) and other progenitors like multipotent progenitors (MPPs) and common lymphoid progenitors (CLP).

Role in cancer 

CD135 is a proto-oncogene, meaning that mutations of this protein can lead to cancer. Mutations of the FLT3 receptor can lead to the development of leukemia, a cancer of bone marrow hematopoietic progenitors. Internal tandem duplications of FLT3 (FLT3-ITD) are the most common mutations associated with acute myelogenous leukemia (AML) and are a  prognostic indicator associated with adverse disease outcome.

FLT3 inhibitors 

Gilteritinib, a dual FLT3-AXL tyrosine kinase inhibitor has completed a phase 3 trial of relapsed/refractory acute myeloid leukemia in patients with FLT3 ITD or TKD mutations.   In 2017, gilteritinib gained FDA orphan drug status for AML. In November 2018, the FDA approved gilteritinib for treatment of adult patients with relapsed or refractory acute myeloid leukemia (AML) with a FLT3 mutation as detected by an FDA-approved test.
Quizartinib (AC220) was tested in a phase II clinical trial for AML patients with FLT3 mutations. for refractory AML – particularly in patients who went on to have a stem cell transplant.

Midostaurin was approved by the FDA in April 2017 for the treatment of adult patients with newly diagnosed AML who are positive for oncogenic FLT3, in combination with chemotherapy. The drug is approved for use with a companion diagnostic, the LeukoStrat CDx FLT3 Mutation Assay, which is used to detect the FLT3 mutation in patients with AML.

Sorafenib has been reported to show significant activity against Flt3-ITD positive acute myelogenous leukemia.

Sunitinib also inhibits Flt3.

Lestaurtinib is in clinical trials.

A paper published in Nature in April 2012 studied patients who developed resistance to FLT3 inhibitors, finding specific DNA sites contributing to that resistance and highlighting opportunities for future development of inhibitors that could take into account the resistance-conferring mutations for a more potent treatment.

See also 

 Cluster of differentiation
 cytokine receptor
 receptor tyrosine kinase
 tyrosine kinase
 oncogene
 hematopoiesis
 Lymphopoiesis#Labeling lymphopoiesis

References

Further reading

External links 
 
 
 

Tyrosine kinase receptors
EC 2.7.10